Besòs may refer to:
 Besòs (river), a river in Catalonia, Spain
 Besòs (Barcelona Metro)